The Second Husband is a South Korean television series starring Cha Seo-won, Uhm Hyun-kyung, Han Ki-woong and Oh Seung-ah. The series, directed by Kim Chil-bong and written by Seo Hyeon-joo for Pan Entertainment, is a passionate romance drama in which a woman who has lost her family unfairly ventures out for revenge amid mixed fate and love.

The daily drama premiered on MBC on August 9, 2021 and aired every weekday at 19:10 (KST) till April 5, 2022. In view of the popularity of the series, it was extended for another 30 episodes from its original 120 episodes making a total of 150 episodes.

Synopsis
Second Husband is a passionate romance story. It revolves around Bong Seon-hwa (Uhm Hyun-kyung) and her family surrounding a confectionery company. She underwent an unfortunate childhood, but due to her strong and positive personality, she rises up. Growing up in the same neighborhood she had a long relationship with Moon Sang-hyeok (Han Ki-woong). But, when she unjustly loses her family due to a tragedy born out of an unstoppable desire, she pledges revenge in the mixed fate and love. Bong Seon-Hwa transforms into 'Sharon' in order to restore what was hers.

Cast

Main
 Cha Seo-won as Yoon Jae-min
 The only son of Yoon Dae-gook and Joo Hae-ran (Dae-gook is the chairman of a confectionery company). He has an MBA from the United States, but wanted to become a singer, and quarreled with his parents over his career choices. It was revealed he was actually Bae Seo-hyun, the eldest son of Seon-hwa’s adoptive mother Bok Bok-soon, who was kidnapped at birth and eventually ended up unknowningly adopted by Hae-ran.
 Uhm Hyun-kyung as Bong Seon-hwa
 Lee Hyo-bi as young Bong Seon-hwa
 A diligent and positive girl, but due to forcing circumstances, pledges revenge. She has a child after a long relationship with Moon Sang-hyeok, but loses the child due to his betrayal and is wrongfully spent four years in jail for murder.
 Oh Seung-ah as Yoon Jae-kyeong 
Jae-min's greedy and evil half-sister, the illegitimate child of the chairman of a confectionery company and someone who does not hesitate to do anything to fulfill her ambitions. She is the main antagonist who killed Seon-hwa’s grandmother and others who will murder anyone who stood in her way. She was in the end sentenced to thirty years’ imprisonment for the murders and other crimes she committed.
 Han Ki-woong as Moon Sang-hyeok,
Seon-hwa's ex-lover, a heartless man who abandons his lover and child for power and money. He later gotten his comeuppance by spending seven years in prison.

Supporting

Daeguk Group 
 Jung Sung-mo as Yoon Dae-gook, the chairman of confectionery company. He murdered his best friend in order to pursue Joo Hae Ran, and masks his evil doings from everyone around him. He thinks bloodline is very important and favors Jae-Min over Jae-Gyeong. He fails to acknowledge Yoon Jae-Gyung until she becomes pregnant with his grandson. He even tried to harm Seon-Hwa several times. His crimes were exposed in the end and he was sentenced to fifteen years in prison.
 Ji Soo-won as Joo Hae-ran 
Jae-min's mother, Yoon Dae-gook's wife, the chairman of the Ace Welfare Foundation. Despite being quiet and classy always, she is vengeful and clever. She uses Dae-gook to gain power to get revenge at him as she blames him for her daughter’s disappearance. It was revealed later that she was Seon-hwa’s real mother and felt guilty for abusing and abandoning her real daughter. Eventually, she and Seon-hwa acknowledge each other and their relationship began to improve.
 Kang Yoon as Kim Soo-cheol
 The secretary of Chairman Yoon of the confectionery company, who was brought in by Joo Hae-Ran at a young age. He secretly loves Jae-Gyeong and is loyal to her, and helped her commit several crimes. He eventually realised her true nature and thus confessed to the crime Seon-Hwa was accused of, and even exposed Jae-kyung. Soo-chul was in the end sentenced to five years’ jail.

Hanok Bakery  
 Lee Ho-sung as Bae Dal-bong 
Bok-Soon's father-in-law and Bae Seo-joon's grandfather. He has considerable wealth, but has frugal ways.
 Kim Hee-jung as Bok Bok-soon
Bae Dal-bong's daughter-in-law. Bae Seo-joon's mother. She lost her daughter Seo-jeong and treats Bong Seon-hwa as a daughter She was revealed to have an eldest son named Seo-hyun, who was kidnapped at birth and remained missing till this day.
 Shin Woo-gyeom as Bae Seo-joon 
Bok-soon's son, Bae Dal-bong's grandchild

Sang-hyeok's family 
 Choi Ji-yeon as Yang Mal-ja, Moon Sang-hyeok and Moon Sang-mi's mother. She is shameless and greedy, and thinks very highly of her son.
 Chun Yi-seul as Moon Sang-mi, an aspiring model, Moon Sang-hyeok's sister, she has crush on Bae Seo-joon

Bong Seon-hwa's family 
 Sung Byung-sook as Han Gop-boon, Seon-hwa's grandmother, who was murdered in the middle of the series by Jae-kyung

Others 
 Kim Sung-hee as Park Haeng-sil
Yoon Jae-kyeong's mother, a former room salon madam. She is greedy and evil like her daughter. However, it was revealed that she is not Jae-kyeong’s biological mother as she kidnaps her from the hospital.
 Lee Kan-hee as Ok Kyeong-i  
Bok-soon, Sokja's hometown friend, Kang In-ho's ex-wife
 Son Kwang-eop as Kang In-ho, an entrepreneur
 Kim Jung-hwa as Choi Eun-gyeol, who was ordered by Yoon Jae-Kyung to pretend to be Bong Bit-na, Joo Hae-ran's biological daughter.

Special appearance
 Tony Ahn as a producer
 Im Chan-mi

Production
Initially, Seo Eun-woo was cast in the role of Yoon Jae-kyeong, but due to the production schedule she dropped out, and Oh Seung-ah took over.

This daily drama marks Uhm Hyun-kyung's reappearance in a MBC production three years after the Saturday revenge drama Hide and Seek in 2018. Uhm Hyun-kyung and Cha Seo-won are also reuniting after playing the second leads in TVN's 2019 miniseries Miss Lee. Oh Seung-ah and Kim Hee-jung are reunited after MBC's 2018 daily drama Secrets and Lies.

On December 7, 2021 one of the drama's staff tested positive for the COVID-19. On December 8, 2021 it was revealed that the main leads and director are negative.

On January 6, 2022, it was reported that the series is confirmed to air for extended time than its initial planned 120 episodes.

The filming of the series was completed on March 17, 2022.

Original soundtrack

Part 1

Part 2

Part 3

Part 4

Part 5

Part 6

Part 7

Part 8

Part 9

Part 10

Part 11

Part 12

Viewership

Awards and nominations

Notes

References

External links
  
 The Second Husband at Daum 
 The Second Husband at Naver 
 

MBC TV television dramas
Korean-language television shows
2021 South Korean television series debuts
2022 South Korean television series endings
Television series about revenge
South Korean melodrama television series
Television series by MBC C&I
Television series by Pan Entertainment